is a Japanese manga artist. She has been drawing manga since kindergarten and cites Akira Toriyama and Mutsumi Inomata as influences. In 2005, she released Haridama Magical Cram School, and in 2007, she released Amefurashi: The Rain Goddess. Her manga Venus Versus Virus was adapted into an anime television series in 2007.

Works

References

External links 
  
 

Living people
Manga artists from Ehime Prefecture
Year of birth missing (living people)